The 1986 UMass Minutemen football team represented the University of Massachusetts Amherst in the 1986 NCAA Division I-AA football season as a member of the Yankee Conference. The team was coached by Jim Reid and played its home games at Warren McGuirk Alumni Stadium in Hadley, Massachusetts. The 1986 season was notable as it was Jim Reid's first as coach of the Minutemen. Reid led UMass to their first conference championship since 1982. UMass finished the season with a record of 8–3 overall and 5–2 in conference play.

Schedule

References

UMass
UMass Minutemen football seasons
Yankee Conference football champion seasons
UMass Minutemen football